Jiulongpo is a district forming part of the western part of the Chongqing urban core. Its total population is around 675,000, while its urban city population is nearly 650,000 (2005).

Location

Jiulongpo is one of the main districts in Chongqing, around which are Yuzhong, Shapingba and Dadukou, while Banan and Nan'an are separated from Jiulongpo with rivers. The government of Jiulongpo is in Yangjiaping.

Administrative divisions

Schools
The following schools are in Jiulongpo District:

Chongqing Yucai Middle School
Chongqing Qinghua Middle School

Transport

Metro
Jiulongpo is currently served by two metro lines operated by Chongqing Rail Transit:
 - Xietaizi, Shiqiaopu
 - Yuanjiagang, Xiejiawan, Yangjiaping, Chongqing Zoo, Dayancun, Mawangchang

See also
 Chongqing Zoo

References

 
Districts of Chongqing